The Philadelphia Junior Flyers are a USA Hockey-sanctioned Tier III Junior A ice hockey team from West Chester, Pennsylvania. They play in the South Conference of the Eastern Hockey League (EHL) and Premier (EHLP) at the Ice Line Quad Rinks

The players, ages 16–20, carry amateur status under Junior A guidelines and hope to earn a spot on higher levels of junior hockey in the United States and Canada, Canadian major junior, collegiate, and eventually professional teams.

History
The Philadelphia Junior Flyers were members of the Atlantic Junior Hockey League (AJHL) from 2008 until 2013 when Tier III junior hockey leagues went through a reorganization, which included the AJHL re-branding itself as the Eastern Hockey League (EHL). In 2015, the EHL added a lower level of Tier III junior hockey for player development called the EHL-Elite Division and all the current EHL members, including the Jr. Flyers, were added to the EHL-Premier Division. In 2017, the league re-branded, dropping the Premier name from their top division and renamed the Elite Division to Premier.

The organization currently fields a team at the former Tier III Junior B level in the EHL Premier (and formerly in the Metropolitan Junior Hockey League). It also currently fields youth hockey select teams at the Midget U18, Midget 16U, Bantam, Peewee, and Squirt and Mite levels.

The Jr. Flyers 18 and under team won the silver medal in the 2010 USA Hockey National Tournament in Chicago, Illinois.

Season-by-season records

Alumni
The Junior Flyers have produced a number of alumni playing in higher levels of junior hockey, NCAA Division I, Division III, ACHA college and professional programs, including:
 Jeff Corey - Ontario Reign (ECHL)
 Ed DeWald- Mercyhurst- NCAA D1
 Orel Hershiser - Played for the Junior Flyers before attending Bowling Green State University and a career in Major League Baseball.
 Tyler Hostetter - Adirondack Phantoms (AHL)
 Eric Knodel Toronto Maple Leafs 2009 NHL Entry Draft - Toronto Marlies (AHL)
 Vince Malts Vancouver Canucks 1998 NHL Entry Draft - Amstel Tijgers (Eredivisie
 David Moccia - Adirondack Frostbite (UHL), Asst Coach SUNYAC Plattsburgh (SUNYAC)
 Ryan Mulhern Calgary Flames 1992 NHL Entry Draft - Washington Capitals (NHL)
 John Murray - Johnstown Chiefs (ECHL)
 Eric Tangradi Anaheim Ducks 2007 NHL Entry Draft - Pittsburgh Penguins (NHL), Wilkes-Barre/Scranton Penguins (AHL)

References

External links
 Official Junior Flyers web site
 Official League Website

Amateur ice hockey teams in Pennsylvania
West Goshen Township, Chester County, Pennsylvania
1987 establishments in Pennsylvania
Ice hockey clubs established in 1987